Marek Šovčík (born 8 January 1993) is a Slovak football forward who currently plays for the DOXXbet liga club FK Dukla Banská Bystrica.

FK Dukla Banská Bystrica
He made his professional debut for FK Dukla Banská Bystrica against FC Nitra on 10 November 2012.

References

External links
FK Dukla Banská Bystrica profile

1993 births
Living people
Slovak footballers
Association football forwards
FK Dukla Banská Bystrica players
Slovak Super Liga players